Angela de Jong (born February 27, 1976) is a Dutch journalist, television critic and columnist.

De Jong studied Literature, Film and Television Cultures at the Utrecht University, and finished her studies with a master of journalism at the Erasmus University Rotterdam. She then went on to be correspondent for a local newspaper, Rotterdams Dagblad. De Jong has worked for her current employer, Algemeen Dagblad (AD), since 2005. In 2010, she started as a TV critic, writing columns about current television affairs for that newspaper. She is often invited to talkshows, such as De Wereld Draait Door, Jinek, and RTL Boulevard.

In the summer of 2017, De Jong was a participant in the quiz show De Slimste Mens. She placed first, and went on to win in the final episode, making her the first female winner since the start of the show in 2006. In 2019, she was named 'Most influential woman in media' by feminist monthly magazine, Opzij.

References

Dutch television critics
Dutch columnists
Dutch journalists
Dutch women columnists
Dutch women journalists
1976 births
Living people
21st-century Dutch women